Raymond Ferguson (born 21 August 1969) is a Jamaican cricketer. He played in three List A matches for the Jamaican cricket team in 1998/99.

See also
 List of Jamaican representative cricketers

References

External links
 

1969 births
Living people
Jamaican cricketers
Jamaica cricketers
Cricketers from Kingston, Jamaica